Gwyneddosaurus is a possibly invalid genus of extinct aquatic tanystropheid reptile. The type species, G. erici was described in 1945 by Wilhelm Bock, who identified it as a coelurosaurian dinosaur related to Podokesaurus (at the time, "podokesaurids" were thought to be coelurosaurians). Its remains were found in the Upper Triassic Lockatong Formation of Montgomery County, eastern Pennsylvania, and the holotype includes skull fragments, several vertebra, ribs, gastralia, partial shoulder and hip bones, and several forelimb and hindlimb elements found in soft shale, while the paratype includes a femur and a tibia. The type specimen is ANSP 15072 and it was discovered by Bock's four-year-old son while the paratype is only listed as ?(ASNP coll.).

Friedrich von Huene assigned the animal to Protorosauria in 1948 as the smallest known member of the group, finding it to be most like Macrocnemus. Steel (1970) classified it as a theropod dinosaur, whereas Olsen and Baird (1986) identified it as a chimera of mixed remains from a coelacanth and possibly the tanystropheid Tanytrachelos; Olsen and Flynn (1989) later modified this interpretation, describing the type specimen of Gwyneddosaurus as a "gastric ejection" (regurgitation) composed of Tanytrachelos bones and possibly scraps of a coelacanth.  They noted that this would make Gwyneddosaurus a senior synonym of Tanytrachelos, and recommended conserving the younger but better-represented genus.

References

 Gwyneddosaurus at the Paleobiology Database

Tanystropheids
Prehistoric reptile genera
Norian genera
Late Triassic reptiles of North America
Triassic geology of Pennsylvania
Paleontology in Pennsylvania
Aquatic reptiles
Fossil taxa described in 1945